The History of Little Goody Two-Shoes is a children's story published by John Newbery in London in 1765. The story popularized the phrase "goody two-shoes" as a descriptor for an excessively virtuous person or do-gooder.

Plot
Goody Two-Shoes is a variation of the Cinderella story. The fable tells of Goody Two-Shoes, the nickname of a poor orphan girl named Margery Meanwell, who goes through life with only one shoe. When a rich gentleman gives her a complete pair, she is so happy that she tells everyone that she has "two shoes". Later, Margery becomes a teacher and marries a rich widower. This serves as proof that her virtue has been rewarded and her wealth earned, a popular theme in children's literature of the era.

Publication

The anonymous story was published in London by the John Newbery company, a publisher of popular children's literature. In his introduction to an 1881 edition of the book, Charles Welsh wrote:

The anonymous author
The story has been attributed to the Irish author Oliver Goldsmith, though this is disputed. Because Goldsmith frequently wrote for pay and because of his copious fiction in essays (e.g., The Bee and Citizen of the World), the attribution to Goldsmith is plausible. Washington Irving was one supporter of this attribution; he wrote: "Several quaint little tales introduced in Goldsmith's Essays show that he had a turn for this species of mock history; and the advertisement and title-page bear the stamp of his sly and playful humor." The book has also been attributed to Newbery himself and to Giles Jones, a friend of Newbery's.

Origin of the phrase "goody two-shoes"
Although The History of Little Goody Two-Shoes is credited with popularizing the term "goody two-shoes", the actual origin of the phrase is unknown. For example, it appears a century earlier in Charles Cotton's Voyage to Ireland in Burlesque (1670):
Mistress mayoress complained that the pottage was cold;
'And all long of your fiddle-faddle,' quoth she.
'Why, then, Goody Two-shoes, what if it be?
Hold you, if you can, your tittle-tattle,' quoth he.
The name is used herein to point out the mayoress' comparative privilege; "Goody" (a shortening of "Goodwife"),
being the equivalent of "Mrs." and "Two-shoes", implicitly comparing her to people who have no shoes.

References

External links

 Text of an 1881 reprint of the original version on Project Gutenberg
 Image of a 1787 Edition
 18th Century Children's Book Collections at the British Museum
 1888 chromolithographed pictorial edition at the Internet Archive

18th-century British children's literature
1765 books
Children's fiction books
Works published anonymously
Works by Oliver Goldsmith
Works about orphans